Hemipilia purpureopunctata is a terrestrial orchid native to high elevations (2100–3400 m) in the Tibet and the eastern Himalayas.

Taxonomy
The species was first described by Kai Yung Lang in 1978, as Habenaria purpureopunctata. It was placed in the monotypic genus Hemipiliopsis in 2003. On the basis of molecular phylogenetic studies, in 2014, Hemipiliopsis was subsumed into Hemipilia, with the species becoming Hemipilia purpureopunctata.

References

Flora of Tibet
Flora of East Himalaya
Orchids of China
Orchids of India
purpureopunctata
Plants described in 1978